Cheo Chai Chen is a Singaporean former politician and businessman. A member of the Singapore Democratic Party (SDP), he served as the Member of Parliament (MP) for Nee Soon Central SMC between 1991 and 1997.

Biography
Cheo is a graduate of Nanyang University, where he studied in the Department of Government and Public Administration.

Cheo first stood for Parliament at the 1988 general election, where he was defeated by Ng Pock Too of the governing People's Action Party (PAP) in Nee Soon Central. Ng won 57.6% of the votes in the constituency to Cheo's 38.5% (with a third candidate taking 3.9%).

At the 1991 general election, Cheo again stood against Ng in Nee Soon Central. And this time, in a surprise result, Cheo defeated Ng to win the constituency. Cheo won 12,709 votes (50.3%) to Ng's 12,541 votes (49.7%). Cheo was one of three SDP MPs to be elected – with the party's leader Chiam See Tong retaining his seat in Potong Pasir, and Ling How Doong winning in Bukit Gombak. The leader of the Workers' Party, Low Thia Khiang, was also elected in Hougang, giving the opposition parties a total of four seats. At the previous election, Chiam had been the only opposition MP to win a seat, so the results were seen as a significant success for the opposition.

In 1994, Chiam resigned as the SDP's leader after a dispute with the rest of the party's Central Executive Committee (which included Cheo). After he publicly criticised them, the Central Executive Committee attempted to expel Chiam from the party (which would have forced him to vacate his parliamentary seat), but he won a court case to prevent them from doing so on procedural grounds.

The negative publicity surrounding the dispute with Chiam hurt the SDP's prospects at the next general election in 1997. Cheo was defeated in his bid to be re-elected as Nee Soon Central's MP by the PAP's Ong Ah Heng. Ong won 15,214 votes (61.3%) to Cheo's 9,591 (38.7%). Ling was also defeated in Bukit Gombak. Chiam joined the Singapore People's Party (SPP) after Parliament was dissolved ahead of the election, and was re-elected as Potong Pasir's MP representing his new party. The SDP was thus left with no seats in Parliament.

At the 2001 general election, Cheo stood as a member of the SDP's team in the Hong Kah Group Representation Constituency. The PAP's team won the contest with 79.7% of the votes to the SDP team's 20.3%.

In 2006, Cheo joined the National Solidarity Party. At the 2006 general election (in which the NSP's candidates stood under the banner of the Singapore Democratic Alliance) Cheo was a candidate in the Jalan Besar Group Representation Constituency. The PAP's team won the contest with 69.3% of the votes to 30.7%.

At the 2011 general election, Cheo was a member of the NSP's team in the Marine Parade Group Representation Constituency. The PAP's team (which was led by former Prime Minister Goh Chok Tong) defeated the NSP's team by 56.6% of the votes to 43.4%.

At the 2015 general election, Cheo stood as the NSP's candidate in the single-member constituency of MacPherson. The NSP's decision contest this constituency was controversial as the Workers' Party had already announced that it planned to field a candidate against the PAP in the constituency, and the NSP's Acting Secretary-General, Hazel Poa, resigned from the party stating that she disagreed with the decision of the party's Central Executive Committee to contest in MacPherson. The NSP had originally planned to field Steve Chia in the constituency, but Chia withdrew from the contest so the NSP decided to field Cheo instead against the PAP's Tin Pei Ling and the Workers' Party's Bernard Chen. During the election campaign, Cheo drew considerable criticism for telling reporters that Tin's status as a new mother was "her weakness" and saying that she might spend more time focusing on her child than on her constituents. Cheo later claimed that this comment was meant as a joke. In the end, Cheo took just 0.8% of the votes in the constituency, compared to Chen's 33.6% and Tin's 65.6%, thus forfeiting his $14,500 election deposit.

References

Singaporean people of Hokkien descent
Members of the Parliament of Singapore
Singapore Democratic Party politicians
National Solidarity Party (Singapore) politicians
Living people
Year of birth missing (living people)